was a Japanese painter. She was born in  Futamata, Iwata-gun, Shizuoka Prefecture (currently, Nimata Town, Tenryu Ward, Hamamatsu City). She became known by her paintings of Indian themes, landscapes and peoples.

Life and career 
Akino got a degree in teaching from Shizuoka's Normal School (current Shizuoka University Faculty of Education) in 1926. She taught classes at an elementary school, but quit after a year. Akino then went to Kyoto to learn Japanese-style painting (Nihonga), under the guidance of Suisho Nishiyama.

In 1948, Akino left the Japan Fine Arts Exhibition and joined the Sozo Bijutsu (Creative Arts) group, together with Uemura Shoko  and  Fukuda Toyoshiro,  seeking a renewal of Japanese art. The following year, she became an assistant professor at Kyoto City University of Arts.

When she was 53 years old, Akino was invited by India's Visva-Bharati University to be a visiting professor. Charmed by the country, she started to work on Indian themes. Akino visited India several times, painting the country's landscapes, buildings and peoples. Akino also visited Bangladesh, Nepal, Cambodia and Africa.

Akino died on 11 October 2001, in Kyoto, of a heart attack.

Honors 

Akino was named a Person of Cultural Merit in 1991 and was awarded the Order of Culture in 1999. A museum housing her artworks was built in her hometown of Hamamatsu in 1998. The museum was designed by Japanese architect Terunobu Fujimori.

References

External links 
 Fuku Akino page (in Japanese)

1908 births
2001 deaths
20th-century Japanese women artists
Nihonga painters
People from Shizuoka Prefecture